Inside Macintosh is the developer documentation published by Apple Computer, documenting the APIs and machine architecture of the Macintosh's classic Mac OS.

Early editions 
The first Inside Macintosh documentation, for the Mac 128K, was distributed in two large binders with photocopied 3-hole-punched pages. Every few months, updated sections were distributed for insertion into the binders. Some of the original sections were written by very early members of the Macintosh group, including Chris Espinosa and Joanna Hoffman. 

In July 1982, Caroline Rose was hired to take over the software documentation, while Bradley Hacker focused on documenting the hardware. In addition to being the lead writer, Rose edited Volumes I–III and was the project supervisor. In 1984, additional writers joined the effort, including Robert Anders, Mark Metzler, Kate Withey, Steve Chernicoff, Andy Averill, and Brent Davis.   

Due to numerous last-minute software changes, the official version to be published by Addison-Wesley was delayed. In the meantime, a $25 Promotional Edition (known as the "phone book edition" because it was published by phone book publisher Lakeside Press) became available in April 1985.

Addison-Wesley published Volumes I–III in July 1985 in two formats: as three separate paperback books and as one hardcover book combining all three volumes. It was the official technical documentation for the original Mac 128K, the  Mac 512K ("Fat Mac"), and Mac XL models.

Reception
Reactions to Volumes I–III were mixed. While many praised the documentation for its clarity, thoroughness, and consistency, others disagreed, particularly complaining about the lack of sample code.

Among the positive feedback were the following:

 In the January 27, 1986, issue of InfoWorld, columnist John C. Dvorak wrote that the highlight of the Appleworld Conference, for many, was Addison-Wesley’s publication of Inside Macintosh. "It's $75 and worth every penny. It tells you everything you never wanted know about the Macintosh—a must for any developer."

 Also in 1986, Inside Macintosh Volumes I–III won an Award of Achievement in the Society for Technical Communication's Northern California competition.

 In 1988, noted software developer and columnist Stan Krute wrote, "If Pulitzers had a technical writing category, Inside Mac would win a prize. [Its writers] have given us the most comprehensive insight into a complex cybernetic system yet seen."

On the negative side:

 Bruce F. Webster in Byte of December 1985 described Inside Macintosh as "infamous, expensive, and obscure", but "for anyone wanting to do much with the Mac ... the only real [printed] source of information." He quoted Kathe Spracklen, developer of Sargon, as saying that the book "consists of 25 chapters, each of which requires that you understand the other 24 before reading it."
 A Mac GUI article by Dog Cow quotes Robert C. Platt as saying, "The best guide to the Mac's ROMs is Inside Macintosh. Unfortunately, Inside Macintosh is also the most incomprehensible documentation ever written."

Volumes IV–VI 
These versions of Inside Macintosh were subsequently published by Addison-Wesley (with authorship attributed only to Apple Computer in general):

 Volume IV (October 1986) documented the changes to the system software in the Mac Plus, which was introduced in January 1986.
 Volume V (February 1988) documented the Mac II and Mac SE, which were introduced in 1987. It discussed Color QuickDraw, as well as the Mac II and Mac SE hardware and other new software components.
 Volume VI (April 1991) described System 7. With 32 chapters, it was thicker than the first three volumes combined.

All of these volumes were designed to be read together; no information was repeated.

New approach 
Shortly after Volume VI was published, Apple revamped the entire Inside Macintosh series, breaking it into volumes according to the functional area discussed, rather than specific machine models or capabilities. In this form, the series was far more coherent and a much better reference for programmers. As new functionality was added to the classic Mac OS, new volumes could be written without invalidating those published earlier—in contrast to the first series, which became increasingly out of date over time.

In the late 1990s, Apple stopped publishing Inside Macintosh as a printed book, instead making it available as a CD-ROM at least since 1994, as well as online. Since then, the CD variant has been phased out, though Apple developers can still receive online documentation as part of the developer CDs. In its online form, the information is much easier to maintain, but some developers still prefer a printed format.

Inside Macintosh covers only the classic Mac OS; a new set of documentation was introduced for Mac OS X. Initially this documentation included only the Carbon Specification identifying the APIs that were supported in Carbon and the Cocoa documentation inherited from OpenStep. Later, the Carbon Specification was refactored into the Carbon Reference, which actually documented the APIs (taking much content from Inside Macintosh). Today, the Carbon Reference and Cocoa Reference are bundled together in the ADC Reference Library.

References

Classic Mac OS
Addison-Wesley books